There are numerous city streets around the world named Cuba Street. Among them are the following:

In Cuba
Cuba Street, Havana

In New Zealand
Cuba Street, Palmerston North
Cuba Street, Wellington (named after a pioneer settler ship of 1840) 
Cuba Street Petone

In the United Kingdom
Cuba Street, London (in Millwall)